Kaattu Rani may refer to:
 Kaattu Rani (1965 film), a Tamil-language film
 Kaattu Rani (1985 film), a Malayalam-language film